Cynergy Data is an American payment services provider, managing a portfolio of over 100,000 merchants processing $10 billion annually. Headquartered in Alpharetta, Georgia with an operations center in Long Island City, New York, Cynergy Data is owned by the Comvest Group, a private investment firm.

Cynergy Data has been recognized three times by Inc. magazine as one of the fastest-growing privately held companies in America.  The company went through bankruptcy protection in 2009.

History

1995-2007
Cynergy Data was founded in 1995 by Marcelo Paladini as a support organization for those selling electronic payments processing to merchant businesses.

In 1997, Inc. Magazine featured the company in its annual list of the fastest growing, privately held companies in the United States. With a 33% increase in sales for the year 2001 alone, Cynergy Data ranks 451 on the list. In 2002, New York City's Hispanic Chamber of Commerce names Cynergy founders "Entrepreneurs of the Year".

In 2006, Inner City 100 ranked Cynergy Data as number 36 on their list of fastest-growing private companies based in U.S. cities. In April, Cynergy Data acquires Abanco International merchant portfolio and payment gateway services. The acquisition allowed the company to process billions of credit card and other electronic payments annually.

The Nilson Report ranks Cynergy #31 of top U.S. merchant acquirers.

2008-present 

The company partnered with Déjavoo Systems in 2008 to develop merchant solutions.

That same year, point-of-sale provider AccuPOS formed an integration partnership with Cynergy Data's LUCY payment gateway. Cynergy Data was added to Inc. Magazine's Hall of Fame for making its Inner City 100 list five years in a row.

In 2008 the Ernst & Young Entrepreneur of the Year Award in the NY Metropolitan area was to Cynergy Data CEO in the Services Category.

In 2009, Cynergy Data filed a liquidating Chapter 11 plan, with the warning that its assets would only cover lawsuit from holders of first-lien debt.  It later received approval from the United States bankruptcy court for the sale of its assets.

Cynergy Data selected TSYS as its preferred provider of authorization, settlement and dispute resolution services.

Kim Fitzsimmons was CEO of the company from 2012 to 2013. In November 2013, Afshin Yazdian was appointed President & CEO of Cynergy Data.

References 

Financial services companies established in 1995
Financial services companies of the United States
Companies based in Fulton County, Georgia
Privately held companies of the United States
Privately held companies based in Georgia (U.S. state)
Companies established in 1995
1995 establishments in Georgia (U.S. state)
Companies that filed for Chapter 11 bankruptcy in 2009